Indirect inference is a simulation-based method for estimating the parameters of economic models. It is a computational method for determining acceptable macroeconomic model parameters in circumstances where the available data is too voluminous or unsuitable for formal modeling.

See also

Method of simulated moments

References

Estimation methods
Macroeconomics